Henri Moscovici (born 5 May 1944 in Tecuci, Romania) is a Romanian-American mathematician, specializing in non-commutative geometry and global analysis.

Moscovici received his undergraduate degree in 1966 and his doctorate in 1971 at the University of Bucharest under the supervision of Gheorghe Vrânceanu. From 1966 to 1971 Moscovici was an assistant at Politehnica University of Bucharest, from 1971 to 1975 at the Institute of Mathematics of the Romanian Academy and from 1975 to 1977 at the Institute of Atomic Physics in Măgurele, and from 1977 at the INCREST in Bucharest. In 1978 he left for the United States, where he was a visitor at the Institute for Advanced Study in Princeton, New Jersey. 
In 1980 he joined the Ohio State University, where he held the Alice Wood Chair in Mathematics; he is now a Professor Emeritus there.

Moscovici does research on representation theory, global analysis, and non-commutative geometry, in which he has collaborated with, among others, Alain Connes, since the two met at the Institute for Advanced Study in 1978. With Connes he proved in 1990 a refinement of the Atiyah–Singer index theorem. As recounted by Connes in a 2021 interview, Moscovici became his greatest collaborator.

In 1990 he was Invited Speaker with talk Cyclic cohomology and invariants of multiply connected manifold at the International Congress of Mathematicians in Kyoto. He has advised 14 Ph.D. students, including .

In 2001, he received the Ohio State University Distinguished Scholar Award. In 1995 he was a Guggenheim Fellow. From 1999 to 2000 he was at Harvard University as a scholar of the Clay Mathematics Institute. A conference in his honor was held at the Hausdorff Center for Mathematics in Bonn in 2009. He was elected a Fellow of the American Mathematical Society in 2012.

Selected publications
 
  (See Selberg trace formula.)
  (See Novikov conjecture.)

 (also at )
 
  (See Hopf algebra.)
 
  (See Rankin–Cohen bracket.)

References

External links

1944 births
Living people
People from Tecuci
University of Bucharest alumni
Academic staff of the Politehnica University of Bucharest
20th-century Romanian mathematicians
20th-century American mathematicians
21st-century American mathematicians
Topologists
Romanian emigrants to the United States
Institute for Advanced Study visiting scholars
Ohio State University faculty
Fellows of the American Mathematical Society